Donovan Fenton (born November 26, 1988) is a New Hampshire politician.

Education
Fenton earned a B.A. in social sciences from Towson University and an M.A. in political management from George Washington University.

Career
On November 8, 2016, Fenton was elected to the New Hampshire House of Representatives where he represented the Cheshire 8 district. Fenton assumed office in 2016. Fenton is a Democrat. Fenton served 3 terms in the House before announcing a run for NH Senate on May 16, 2022.

Personal life
Fenton resides in Keene, New Hampshire. Fenton is married with two children.

References

Living people
People from Keene, New Hampshire
Towson University alumni
George Washington University alumni
Democratic Party members of the New Hampshire House of Representatives
Democratic Party New Hampshire state senators
21st-century American politicians
1988 births